Gecarcinolaelaps is a genus of mites in the family Laelapidae.

Species
 Gecarcinolaelaps cancer (Pearse, 1929)

References

Laelapidae